Turo's Hevi Gee is a Finnish humorous band from Lahti. Notable hits of the band include "Tampere", "Kyntäjän poika" and "Punaiset on silmät". The band celebrates an annual Turo day in Lahti on 8 July. The band is most famous for creating cover versions of Finnish and foreign hit singles, replacing the lyrics with more humorous ones. The band was founded in 1985.

Current line-up
 Janne Piiroinen (vocals)
 Keppi Heinänen (guitar)
 Hate Kinnunen (drums)
 Arska Hukkanen (bass, background vocals)
 Ismo Karonen (guitar)

Discography
 Santapaperia (1989)
 Rankimmat joululaulut (1989)
 Elämää suurempi äänilevy (1990)
 Tuleva keräilyharvinaisuus (1991)
 Putket mutkalla (1995)
 Ei se mitn! (1999)
 Mitäs tilasit!! (2000)
 Live! No Sleep 'til Pitkämäki (2001)
 Rock'n'rollia G-Pisteestä (2003)
 Lahest! (2006)
 Turo's Hevi Gee (2007)

References

External links
Allmusic discography

Finnish musical groups